Jump is a 2009 Chinese-Hong Kong comedy-drama film written and produced by Stephen Chow and directed by Stephen Fung. The film stars Kitty Zhang, Leon Jay Williams and Daniel Wu with action choreography by Yuen Cheung-yan.

Plot
Phoenix is a young peasant who dreams of becoming a dance star in the big city. One day, a previous resident of the town comes and offers ten slots at his factory to those interested. Phoenix wins one, but she gives it to her best friend Snow instead. They leave their town and travel to Shanghai. Snow takes a job in garment factory. Phoenix accidentally gets a job there, too.

She sneaks out at night and takes another job as a janitor in a dance studio so she can learn enough to be in a hip hop street dance competition. After running into her several times, the owner of the studio helps her take dance classes. Eventually, he (Ron Chan) begins to drop his playboy exterior and takes her out to dinner. One day though, Phoenix catches him saying cruel things about her on the phone, although he tells her its just publicity. Suspicious, she follows him to the airport and sees him meeting a woman there. Phoenix flees back to her home, leaving Ron and Snow confused about where she went.

In her village, Phoenix realizes that she has to follow her dreams no matter what and returns to Shanghai in time for the dance competition. She steps in when one of the dancers sprains her ankle. Despite Phoenix's great dancing, the team loses to the Korean team, South City Crew. All her friends showed up to the competition though, and they reunite joyfully despite losing. A surprise addition to the party is the woman from the airport, who turns out to be Ron's sister. Phoenix and Ron make up and end up together again.

During the credits, Phoenix and her friends are seen returning to the village and teaching everyone to dance to hip hop. Even the scarecrow is dressed in hip-hop clothing.

Cast
 Kitty Zhang as Phoenix
 Leon Jay Williams as Ron Chan
 Daniel Wu as doctor (cameo)
 Yao Wenxue
 Yuen Cheung-yan
 Samuel Pang
 Fung Min-hun
 Lee Sheung-ching as a talent scout
 Prudence Kao
 Zhang Jiangcui
 Lisa Li
 Stephen Fung as an audience member (cameo)

Production
Edison Chen had originally been cast as the lead actor but due to his 2008 photo scandal he was replaced by Williams.

References

External links
 
 Jump at Hong Kong Cinemagic
 
 Jump review at LoveHKFilm.com

2009 films
2009 comedy-drama films
Hong Kong comedy-drama films
2000s Cantonese-language films
Films set in Shanghai
Films directed by Stephen Fung
2000s dance films
Hong Kong dance films
2000s Hong Kong films